Sir James Denning Pearson FRAeS Wh.S.Sch (8 August 1908 – 1 August 1992) is a former Chief Executive of Rolls-Royce Limited.

Early life
He was born in Bootle. His father died when he was eleven. He grew up in Cardiff.

He gained a First Class degree from Cardiff Technical College.

Pearson became a Whitworth Senior Scholar in 1930 having used his Scholarship to do steam turbine research at Metropolitan-Vickers and in 1985 became President of the Whitworth Society.

Career

Rolls-Royce
He joined Rolls-Royce in 1932. During the Second World War, he was Chief Engineer at the R-R shadow factory in Glasgow, producing 150 Merlin engines a week.

He oversaw the expansion of Rolls-Royce into the jet aero-engine market in the 1960s.

Personal life
He married Eluned Henry in 1932, and they had two daughters.

He was knighted in the 1963 New Year Honours. He became an FRAeS in 1964 and was awarded the Gold Medal of the Royal Aero Club in 1967. He died in the Amber Valley of Derbyshire.

References

External links
 New Scientist profile in August 1962
The Papers of Sir (James) Denning Pearson

1908 births
1992 deaths
Alumni of Cardiff University
Businesspeople from Cardiff
English chief executives
Fellows of the Royal Aeronautical Society
People from Amber Valley
People from Bootle
Rolls-Royce people
20th-century English businesspeople
20th-century Welsh businesspeople